Sergey Gusev (born 9 December 1947) is a Russian former swimmer. He competed in three events at the 1968 Summer Olympics for the Soviet Union.

References

1947 births
Living people
Russian male swimmers
Olympic swimmers of the Soviet Union
Swimmers at the 1968 Summer Olympics
Swimmers from Moscow
Soviet male swimmers